The  is a tramway line of Hankai Tramway Co., Ltd. in Osaka, Japan.

History
September 20, 1900 – Osaka Horse Rail Co. (Osaka Basha Tetsudo) from Tennoji-nishimon-mae to Higashi-Tengachaya was opened, with  gauge rails.
November 29, 1900 – The line was extended from Higashi-Tengachaya to Kamisumiyoshi (Present: Kaminoki).
December 27, 1902 – The line was extended from Kamisumiyoshi to Shimosumiyoshi (Later: Sumiyoshijinja-mae, Present: Sumiyoshi).
1907 – Renamed "Osaka Densha Rail Co.", then "Naniwa Densha Tram Co.".
February 1, 1908 – The line was abandoned for the gauge conversion to standard gauge and electrification.
December 24, 1909 – Nankai Railway consolidated Naniwa Densha Tram, then became the Uemachi Line.
October 1, 1910 – The Uemachi Line was reopened after the completion of the gauge conversion and electrification. Tram operations were restarted between Tennoji-nishimon-mae and Sumiyoshijinja-mae.
January 19, 1911 – Through operation to Osaka Municipal Tram started.
January 12, 1912 – Through operation to Osaka Municipal Tram ended.
July 12, 1913 – The Uemachi Line is extended from Sumiyoshijinja-mae to Sumiyoshikoen.
December 24, 1921 – The Uemachi Line from Tennoji-nishimon to Tennoji-ekimae became the line of Osaka Municipal Tram.
June 1, 1944 – Kansai Kyuko Railway Co. and Nankai Railway Co. were consolidated and became Kinki Nippon Railway Co., Ltd. (present: Kintetsu Railway).
June 1, 1947 – Kinki Nippon divided rails of the former Nankai Lines to Nankai Electric Railway Co., Ltd., and the Uemachi Line became one of the lines of the Osaka Tram Line, as well as the Hankai Line and the Hirano Line.
1980 – After the final operation of the Hirano Line on November 27, the Uemachi Line and the Hankai Line were transferred to Hankai Tramway Co., Ltd. on December 1.
July 4, 2009 – Through operation between Tennoji-ekimae and Hamadera-ekimae restarted.
February 2, 2013 – Tennoji-ekimae Station became the only station from which trams go to Hamadera-ekimae.
January 31, 2016 – The Uemachi Line is closed from Sumiyoshi to Sumiyoshikoen.

Operations
Trams are operated between Tennoji-ekimae and Abikomichi or Hamadera-ekimae on the Hankai Line.

Stations

Station numbers are in parentheses.
Current section
 (HN01) - Tokiwadōri -  (HN02) - Nakamichi -  (HN03) -  (HN04) -  (HN05) -  (HN06) -  (HN07) -  (HN08) -  (HN09) -  (HN10)
Through section on the Hankai Line
Sumiyoshi (HN10) -  (HN12) -  (HN13) -  (HN14) -  (HN15) -  (HN16) -  (HN17) -  (HN18) -  (HN19) -  (HN20) -  (HN21) -  (HN22) -  (HN23) -  (HN24) -  (HN25) -  (HN26) -  (HN27) -  (HN28) -  (HN29) -  (HN31)
Dealt section to Osaka City (later abandoned)
Tennōji (near Shitennō-ji) - Chausuyama - Kōen-higashimon
Abandoned section
Kōen-higashimon - Tennoji-eki-mae
 (HN10) -  (HN11)

Connections

References

External links
 Official Route Map

Rail transport in Osaka Prefecture
Railway lines in Japan
Tram transport in Japan
Railway lines opened in 1900
Standard gauge railways in Japan
1067 mm gauge railways in Japan